Israel Belkind (1861–1929) was a Jewish educator, author, writer, historian and founder of the Bilu movement. A pioneer of the First Aliyah, Belkind founded the Biluim, a group of Jewish idealists aspiring to settle in the Land of Israel with the political purpose to redeem Eretz Yisrael and re-establish the Jewish State on it.

Biography
Israel Belkind was born in the region surrounding Minsk in Belarus, then part of the Russian Empire, to Meir and Shifra Belkind. His siblings were Shimon, Sonia and Olga Belkind Hankin, the last a feminist who was involved with redeeming land in Eretz Yisrael. He received a Hebrew education from his father, who was a leader in the movement which promoted Hebrew education in Russia. Belkind also attended a Russian gymnasium and initially intended to attend university. However, the wave of antisemitic attacks and pogroms against Jews in southern Russia on 1881 instead led him to become intensively involved in Zionist activities.
In 1929, Belkind died in Berlin where he had gone to seek medical treatment. His body was brought back to Palestine for burial. He was interred in Rishon LeZion.

Zionist activism
Belkind organized the first organized group of Biluim on 21 January 1882, with the aim of promoting settlement in Ottoman Palestine. To this end, he invited a group of fourteen Jewish ex-university students from Kharkov to his home and together they formed the group which was originally called DAVIO, an acronym for the Hebrew words from Exodus, "Speak unto the children of Israel that they will go forward". Belkind later changed the name to BILU, an acronym for the words from Isaiah, "Beit Yaakov Lechu V'nelcha," "House of Jacob, come and we will go". The group shunned diplomatic or political channels, with their sole goal being to settle in Palestine.

These first group of Bilu pioneers arrived at Palestine in July, 1882. He worked first in Mikveh Yisrael and Rishon LeTzion, and then moved to Gedera, the first official Bilu community. Belkind, however, was unable to adjust to agricultural labor, and therefore, devoted himself to education.

Belkind was the key leader in the Yishuv's protest movement against representatives of Baron Rothschild.

Belkind proposed a name for the agricultural moshava of Rehovot based on the Book of Genesis: "And he called the name of it Rehoboth; and he said: 'For now the Lord hath made room for us, and we shall be fruitful in the land'.".

Pedagogic career
His first teaching post was at a private school in Jaffa, and he then moved to Jerusalem where he taught at the Alliance israélite universelle. In 1904, Israel Belkind established an educational institute in the village of Meir Shfeya, which took in orphans from the Kishinev pogrom. This made it the first youth village in the country. He called it Kiryat Sefer. However, after two years of dispute with the Edmond James de Rothschild's emissaries at the colony, Belkind was prompted to move the children to Ben Shemen.

Literary career
Belkin published several textbooks and wrote for contemporary journals. He was the editor of HaMeir, a monthly publication on settlement and the Yishuv. He published his memoirs, "The First Steps of the Jewish Settlement in Palestine" (1918)  in the United States during World War I.

In 1928 he published a geographical work in Russian, The Land of Israel Today, as well as an anthropological work on the Palestinian Arabs in Hebrew, Arabs in Eretz Israel, a book in which he advances the ideas that the Arabs of Palestine are descended from the ancient Hebrews and that the dispersion of Jews after the destruction of the Temple by the Roman general Titus is a "historic error" that must be corrected, for it dispersed much of the land's Jewish community around the world, while those "workers of the land that remained attached to their land" were eventually converted to Christianity and then Islam. He therefore, argued that this historical wrong must be corrected by embracing the local Arabs as their own and proposed the opening of Hebrew schools for Muslim Arabs of Palestine to teach them Arabic, Hebrew and universal culture.

References

External links
 
Israel Belkind family album - Rishon LeTzion

1861 births
1929 deaths
Ashkenazi Jews in Ottoman Palestine
Ashkenazi Jews in Mandatory Palestine
Belarusian Jews
Belarusian Zionists
Bilu
Emigrants from the Russian Empire to the Ottoman Empire
Jewish educators
Jewish historians
Jewish writers
Jews in Mandatory Palestine
Jews in Ottoman Palestine
Jews from the Russian Empire
People from Lahoysk District
Zionist activists